Alex Olmedo defeated Rod Laver in the final, 6–4, 6–3, 6–4, to win the gentlemen's singles tennis title at the 1959 Wimbledon Championships. Ashley Cooper was the defending champion, but was ineligible to compete after turning professional.

Seeds

  Alex Olmedo (champion)
  Neale Fraser (quarterfinals)
  Nicola Pietrangeli (first round)
  Bobby Wilson (quarterfinals)
  Barry MacKay (semifinals)
  Luis Ayala (quarterfinals)
  Kurt Nielsen (second round)
  Roy Emerson (semifinals)

Draw

Finals

Top half

Section 1

Section 2

Section 3

Section 4

Bottom half

Section 5

Section 6

Section 7

Section 8

References

External links

Men's Singles
Wimbledon Championship by year – Men's singles